Compsomantis crassiceps is a species of praying mantis found in Borneo and Java.

References

Compsomantis
Mantodea of Asia
Insects of Borneo
Insects of Java
Insects described in 1842
Taxa named by Wilhem de Haan